Taboo! is the 3rd studio album (in the U.S) by singer/songwriter Jonny Blu, released in the United States on 6 October 2009 by Peer Music and Dao Feng Music. It is a compilation of classic Latin Standards from the Peer Music catalog.

Track listing
"Taboo" ("Tabú") – 3:12
"Be True to Me" ("Sabor A Mí")  – 3:02
"Frenesí"  – 2:25
"Perhaps Perhaps Perhaps" ("Quizas quizas quizas")  – 2:42
"Say No More" ("Mais que Nada")  – 4:20
"Adiós"  – 3:54
"Bésame Mucho"  – 3:14
"Time Was" ("Duerme")  – 2:24
"Babaloo" ("Babalú")  – 2:31
"Amor" – 3:48
"Sabor A Mí" (en Español) – 3:02
"Bésame Mucho (en Español)" – 3:14
"Perhaps Perhaps Perhaps" (Duet with Juanita Rosa) – 2:43

Also contains full instrumentals for the first ten songs

Personnel

Musicians
Jonny Blu – vocals
Bob Malone – piano, music arrangements
John Chiodini – guitar, 12 string guitar
Chris Conner – bass
Lee Thornburg – trumpet
Nick Lanel – trombone
Doug Webb – saxophone, woodwind, clarinet, flute
Jimmy Paxson – drums, percussion
John Acosta – cello
Candy Girard – violin
Sai-Ly – violin
Alex Shlifer – violin
Tom Tally – violin
Todd Herfindal – percussion
Brady L. Benton – percussion
Bob Malone – orchestra leader

Production
Todd Herfindal – producer, engineer, mixing
Louis White – producer, engineer, mixing
Bob Malone – arranger, producer
Brady L. Benton – producer
Jonny Blu – producer
Stephen Marsh – mixing, mastering
Yvonne Gomez – executive producer for Peer-Southern Productions, Inc./Peer Music
Kathy Spanberger – executive producer for Peer-Southern Productions, Inc/Peer Music
Paul Gonzales – artwork, album package design
Rebecca Sapp – front cover photography
Gisela Prishker – inside and back cover photography

2009 albums
Jonny Blu albums